This is a list of museums in the Falkland Islands.

Museums in the Falkland Islands 

 Falkland Islands Museum
 Barnard Memorial Museum

See also 

 List of museums

External links 	

 
Falkland Islands
Falkland Islands
Museums
Museums